Uorfi Javed (born 15 October 1997; formerly Urfi Javed), is an Indian television actress and a social media influencer. Known for her unique fashion sense and social media presence, Javed rose to fame in 2021 after appearing on Voot's reality show Bigg Boss OTT.

Early life 
Javed was born in a Muslim family in Lucknow, Uttar Pradesh on 15 October 1997. She did her schooling from City Montessori School, Lucknow. She graduated from Amity University, Lucknow in mass communication.

Career

Early career (2016-2021) 
In 2016, Javed appeared in Sony TV's Bade Bhaiyya Ki Dulhania as Avni Pant. From 2016 to 2017, she played Chhaya in Star Plus's Chandra Nandini. Then, she portrayed Aarti in Star Plus's Meri Durga. 

In 2018, she played Kamini Joshi in SAB TV's Saat Phero Ki Hera Pherie, Bella Kapoor in Colors TV's Bepannaah, Piyali in Star Bharat's Jiji Maa and Nandini in &TV's Daayan.

In 2020, she joined Yeh Rishta Kya Kehlata Hai as Shivani Bhatia. She later played Tanisha Chakraborty in Kasautii Zindagii Kay.

Bigg Boss OTT and rise to fame (2021-present) 
In 2021, she participated in Voot's reality show Bigg Boss OTT where she finished at 13th place. According to Vice, Javed "shot to fame in India" following her appearances on Bigg Boss OTT, where she achieved popular recognition for her unique fashion sense.

In 2022, she was seen in a music video with Indo-Canadian singer Kunwarr. In December 2022, she participated in MTV India's reality show MTV Splitsvilla X4 as a guest contestant and mischief maker.

In 2023, it was reported by various media outlets that Urfi was detained in Dubai, United Arab Emirates for filming while wearing provocative clothing in a public area, which is against the law in the UAE. However, Javed clarified that the police had come on the set because of a logistics issue, not for reasons related to her choice of attire. The shoot resumed the next day.

Personal life

Javed began dating her Meri Durga co-actor Paras Kalnawat in 2017. The couple broke up in 2018.

Religion 
Though raised in a conservative Muslim family, Javed has stated that "I don't believe in Islam and I don't follow any religion". In 2021, Javed stated that she would not marry a Muslim man, and said she was in the process of reading the Bhagavad Gita. Amid a debate over changing the name of her hometown of Lucknow in 2023, Javed tweeted "I want to stay in a democratic rashtra! Neither Hindu rashtra nor Muslim rashtra."

Name change 
In 2022, she announced her change of name to Uorfi on social media, and suggested that she be referred to by her new name. Although pronounced the same, the change in spelling was done on advice of a numerologist.

Public image

Fashion sense 
Javed gained public recognition for her fashion sense during her time as a contestant on Bigg Boss OTT, where she wore a dress made out of a garbage bag. Javed has made and wore a number of pieces described as 'bizarre dresses' by Lifestyle Asia, including dresses made out of watches, yellow flowers, chains, and pins.

Online presence 
In December 2022, Javed received the distinction of becoming one of the most searched Asians on Google, ahead of Bollywood celebrities including Janhvi Kapoor and Disha Patani. As of January 2023, Javed has over four million Instagram followers.

In a tweet, Bharatiya Janata Party (BJP) politician Chitra Wagh accused Javed of "indulging in nudity publicly on the streets of Mumbai". Following Wagh's complaint, the Mumbai Police called Javed in for inquiry at a police station in Amboli. Javed filed a complaint against Wagh, alleging that politician was engaging in "threatening and criminal intimidation to harm the actor in the public domain."

Filmography

Television

Web series

References

External links 

 
 

Living people
21st-century Indian actresses
Indian television actresses
Bigg Boss (Hindi TV series) contestants
1997 births